Catherine McAuley, RSM (29 September 1778 – 11 November 1841) was an Irish Catholic religious sister who founded the Sisters of Mercy in 1831.
The women's congregation has always been associated with teaching, especially in Ireland, where the sisters taught Catholics (and at times Protestants) at a time when education was mainly reserved for members of the established Church of Ireland.

Life 
Catherine Elizabeth McAuley was born at Strokestown House in Dublin to James and Elinor (née Conway) McAuley. Her father died in 1783 when she was five and her mother died in 1798. Catherine went first to live with a maternal uncle, Owen Conway, and later joined her brother James and sister Mary at the home of William Armstrong, a Protestant relative on her mother's side. In 1803, McAuley became the household manager and companion of William and Catherine Callaghan, an elderly, childless, and wealthy Protestant couple and friends of the Armstrong's, at their estate in Coolock, a village northeast of Dublin. For 20 years she gave catechetical instruction to the household servants and the poor village children. Catherine Callaghan, who was raised in the Quaker tradition, died in 1819. When William Callaghan died in 1822, Catherine McAuley became the sole residuary legatee of their estate.

The House of Mercy
Catherine McAuley inherited a considerable fortune and chose to use it to build a house where she and other compassionate women could take in homeless women and children to provide care and education for them. A location was selected at the junction of Lower Baggot Street and Herbert Street, Dublin, and in June 1824, the cornerstone was laid by the Rev. Dr Blake. As it was being refurbished, she studied current educational methods in preparation for her new endeavour. On the feast of Our Lady of Mercy, 24 September 1827, the new institution for destitute women, orphans, and schools for the poor was opened and Catherine McAuley, with two companions, undertook its management.

Sisters of Mercy
For three years, Catherine and her companions continued their work as lay women.
Catherine McAuley never intended to found a community of religious women. Her initial intention was to assemble a lay corps of Catholic social workers. In 1828 the archbishop permitted the staff of the institute to assume a distinctive dress and to publicly visit the sick. The uniform adopted was a black dress and cape of the same material reaching to the belt, a white collar and a lace cap and veil – such a costume as is now worn by the postulants of the congregation. In the same year the archbishop desired Miss McAuley to choose some name by which the little community might be known, and she chose that of "Sisters of Mercy", having the design of making the works of mercy the distinctive feature of the institute.

She was desirous that the members should combine with the silence and prayer of the Carmelites, with the active labours of a Sister of Charity. The position of the institute was anomalous, its members were not bound by vows nor were they restrained by rules. The church (clergy and people) of the time, however, were not supportive of groups of laywomen working independently of church structures. The main concern was for the stability and continuity of the works of mercy which the women had taken on. Should any of them get married or lose interest, the poor and the orphans whom they were caring for would then be at a loss.

Catherine's clerical mentor urged her to form a religious institute. Catherine and two other women, Anna Maria Doyle and Elizabeth Harley, entered the novitiate (formation program) of the Presentation Sisters to formally prepare for life as women religious in September 1830. On 12 December 1831 they professed vows and returned to the House of Mercy. The Sisters of Mercy consider 12 December 1831 as the day of their founding as a religious community. Archbishop Daniel Murray assisted Catherine McAuley in founding the Sisters of Mercy, and professed the first three members. He then appointed Catherine Mother Superior.

A cholera epidemic hit Dublin in 1832, and Catherine agreed to staff a cholera hospital on Townsend Street.

Between 1831 and 1841 she founded additional Convents in Tullamore, Charleville, Cork, Carlow, Galway, Limerick, Birr, Bermondsey and Birmingham and branch houses in Kingstown and Booterstown. 

The rule of the Sisters of Mercy was formally confirmed by Pope Gregory XVI on 6 June 1841.
Catherine lived only ten years as a Sister of Mercy, Sister Mary Catherine.

Death

Catherine McAuley died of tuberculosis on 11 November 1841 at Baggot Street, at the age of sixty-three.
At the time of her death, there were 100 Sisters of Mercy in ten foundations. Shortly thereafter, small groups of sisters left Ireland to establish new foundations on the east and west coasts of the United States, in Newfoundland, Australia, New Zealand, and Argentina.

Total worldwide membership consists of about 5,500 Sisters of Mercy, 5000 Associates, and close to half a million partners in ministry. The Mercy International Centre in Dublin, Ireland, is the international "home" of Mercy worldwide and the mercyworld.org website is the virtual home.

In 1978, the cause for the beatification of the Servant of God Catherine McAuley was opened by Pope Paul VI. In 1990, upon recognition of her heroic virtues, Pope John Paul II declared her Venerable.

See also
List of people on stamps of Ireland

References

Further reading
 Mary C. Sullivan. The Path of Mercy: The Life of Catherine McAuley (Catholic University of America Press; 2012) 500 pages; scholarly biography

External links
 Mercy International Centre

1778 births
1842 deaths
18th-century Irish women
19th-century Irish nuns
Founders of Catholic religious communities
19th-century Irish philanthropists
People from Coolock
Sisters of Mercy
Venerated Catholics by Pope John Paul II
19th-century venerated Christians